The New Zealand Herald is a daily newspaper published in Auckland, New Zealand, owned by New Zealand Media and Entertainment, and considered a newspaper of record for New Zealand. It has the largest newspaper circulation of all newspapers in New Zealand, peaking at over 200,000 copies in 2006, although circulation of the daily Herald had declined to 100,073 copies on average by September 2019. Its main circulation area is the Auckland region. It is also delivered to much of the upper North Island including Northland, Waikato and King Country.

History 
The New Zealand Herald was founded by William Chisholm Wilson, and first published on 13 November 1863. Wilson had been a partner with John Williamson in the New Zealander, but left to start a rival daily newspaper as he saw a business opportunity with Auckland's rapidly growing population. He had also split with Williamson because Wilson supported the war against the Māori (which the Herald termed "the native rebellion") while Williamson opposed it. The Herald also promoted a more constructive relationship between the North and South Islands.

After the New Zealander closed in 1866 The Daily Southern Cross provided competition, particularly after Julius Vogel took a majority shareholding in 1868. The Daily Southern Cross was first published in 1843 by William Brown as The Southern Cross and had been a daily since 1862. Vogel sold out of the paper in 1873 and Alfred Horton bought it in 1876.

In 1876 the Wilson family and Horton joined in partnership and The New Zealand Herald absorbed The Daily Southern Cross.

In 1879 the United Press Association was formed so that the main daily papers could share news stories. The organisation became the New Zealand Press Association in 1942. In 1892, the New Zealand Herald, Otago Daily Times, and Press agreed to share the costs of a London correspondent and advertising salesman. The New Zealand Press Association closed in 2011.

The Wilson and Horton families were both represented in the company, known as Wilson & Horton, until 1996 when Tony O'Reilly's Independent News & Media Group of Dublin purchased the Horton family's interest in the company. The Herald is now owned by New Zealand Media and Entertainment. That company was owned by Sydney-based APN News & Media and the Radio Network, formerly owned by the Australian Radio Network.

Notable contributors 
 Dita de Boni was a columnist for the newspaper, writing her first columns for the NZ Herald in 1995. From 2012–2015 she wrote a business and politics column until – after a series of articles increasingly critical of the Key government – the Herald discontinued her column for financial reasons. 
Gordon Minhinnick was a staff cartoonist from the 1930s until his retirement in the 1980s. 
Malcolm Evans was dismissed from his position as staff cartoonist in 2003 after the newspaper received complaints about his cartoons on the conflict between Israel and Palestine.
Laurence Clark was the daily political cartoonist from 1987 to 1996, and continued to publish cartoons weekly in the Herald until 2000.
William Berry, editor of the New Zealand Herald in 1875 and the Daily Southern Cross in 1877

Format 
On 10 September 2012, the Herald moved to a compact format for weekday editions, after 150 years publishing in broadsheet format. The broadsheet format was retained for the Saturday edition.

Organisational restructuring 
In April 2007, APN NZ announced it was outsourcing the bulk of the Heralds copy editing to an Australian-owned company, Pagemasters.

In November 2012, two months after the launch of its new compact format, APN News and Media announced it would be restructuring its workforce, cutting eight senior roles from across the Heralds range of titles.

Political stance and editorial opinion 
The Herald is traditionally a centre-right newspaper, and was given the nickname "Granny Herald" into the 1990s.

The Herald stance on the Middle East is supportive of Israel, as seen most clearly in its 2003 censorship and dismissal of cartoonist Malcolm Evans following his submission of cartoons critical of Israel.

In 2007, an editorial strongly disapproved of some legislation introduced by the Labour-led government, the Electoral Finance Act, to the point of overtly campaigning against the legislation.

Journalistic mishaps

Mistaken identity incident 
In July 2014, the Herald published a front-page story about the death of Guy Boyland, a New Zealand-born soldier killed in Gaza. The paper pulled a photograph of the television star Ryan Dunn, killed in 2011, from Boyland's Facebook page, erroneously claiming it was of Boyland. When the Heralds mistake was revealed, the paper issued apologies to Boyland's family, his friends, and the paper's readers. In a 2016 study by Philippa K. Smith and Helen Sissons, the authors said the mistake was caused by "a series of lapses in the newsroom". They concluded that the incident caused damage to the Herald reputation, which it tried to repair by apologising. The Herald promised to reform its newsroom processes.

Ethics incident 
In July 2015, the New Zealand Press Council ruled that Herald columnist Rachel Glucina had failed to properly represent herself as a journalist when seeking comment from Amanda Bailey on a complaint she had made about Prime Minister John Key repeatedly pulling her hair when he was a customer at the cafe in which she worked. The Herald published Bailey's name, photo, and comments after she had retracted permission for Glucina to do so. The council said there was an "element of subterfuge" in Glucina's actions and that there was not enough public interest to justify her behaviour. In its ruling the council said that, "The NZ Herald has fallen sadly short of those standards in this case." The Heralds editor denied the accusations of subterfuge. Glucina subsequently resigned from the newspaper.

Titles

The Weekend Herald
In 1998 the Weekend Herald was set up as a separate title and the newspaper's website was launched.

Herald on Sunday 
A compact-sized Sunday edition, the Herald on Sunday, was first published on 3 October 2004 under the editorship of Suzanne Chetwin and then, for five years, by Shayne Currie. It won Newspaper of the Year for the calendar years 2007 and 2009 and is New Zealand's most-read Sunday newspaper. In 2010, the Herald on Sunday started a campaign to reduce the legal blood alcohol limit for driving in New Zealand, called the "Two Drinks Max" campaign. The paper set up a campaign Facebook page, a Twitter account, and encouraged readers to sign up to the campaign on its own website. It is currently edited by Alanah Eriksen.

Herald Online website 
The newspaper's online news service, originally called Herald Online, was established in 1998. It was redesigned in late 2006, and again in 2012. The site was named best news website at the 2007 and 2008 Qantas Media Awards, won the "best re-designed website" category at the 2007 New Zealand NetGuide Awards, and was one of seven newspaper sites named an Official Honouree in the 2007 Webby Awards. A paywall was added for "premium content" starting on 29 April 2019.

Editors 
Managing editor: Shayne Currie
Weekends editor: Stuart Dye

Regular columnists 
 Deborah Coddington, Herald on Sunday
 Matt McCarten, Herald on Sunday
 Brian Rudman
 Colin James is a past columnist

Arms

References

External links 
 
 
 Sold on APN (for advertisers)

Newspapers published in New Zealand
Mass media in Auckland
Companies based in Auckland
Publications established in 1863
New Zealand Media and Entertainment
1863 establishments in New Zealand